Empire Kosher Poultry, Inc. is the largest producer of kosher poultry in the United States. The company's headquarters, hatchery and processing facility are located in Mifflintown, Pennsylvania.

History

Early years
Empire Kosher was founded in 1938 in Liberty, New York by Joseph N. Katz, an Austrian-Jewish immigrant to the United States. The Katz family, including Joseph's son Murray, owned and ran the business for the first five decades of operation.

In the 1930s and 1940s, the Katz family recruited the rabbis required for the kosher production process from Mandatory Palestine as well as Jewish communities in Europe, and the company initially operated out of a garage in Liberty, New York. (The company's name comes from the nickname for New York State.) In the 1950s, Empire became known as an innovator in kosher food production.

Relocation and expansion
Early in the 1960s, while still owned by the Katz family, the company relocated to Mifflintown, Pennsylvania, approximately 40 miles outside of Harrisburg, Pennsylvania, where it is still headquartered today. Katz purchased a processing plant in Mifflintown, and expanded production in order to meet the demand provided by the growing Jewish middle class. Empire became the first kosher food company to move into mainstream supermarket distribution.

Competition and debt
In 1986, a fire destroyed the production line at the Mifflintown plant, and the Katz family invested nearly $20 million to rebuild and modernize the plant. In 1992, Empire was sold to private equity firm Apollo Management, and several years later sold to another private equity firm, J.W. Childs Associates, and the company carried a high debt burden.

Investment and growth
In 2003, Empire was purchased by a consortium of private investors led by Greg Rosenbaum. The company modernized and expanded its plant and production line, more than doubling production capacity by 2009. Empire currently processes 240,000 chickens and 27,000 turkeys per week, with annual revenue over $100 million, making it the largest U.S. producer of kosher poultry.

Empire's workforce is unionized, and are members of the United Food and Commercial Workers Local 1776. Under its current ownership, Empire has donated kosher food to community food pantries. In 2011, the Metropolitan Council on Jewish Poverty granted Empire's CEO its Humanitarian Award. In addition, Empire has received positive press coverage regarding its animal welfare and environmental standards.

Production and distribution

Hatching and growing
Empire states that it hatches its own poultry eggs at an on-site hatchery in Mifflintown, and that all of its chickens and turkeys are grown on small family farms within a 90-mile radius of the Mifflintown plant.

Empire claims that its quality control inspectors are "five times stricter than USDA inspectors", and says that its poultry also adheres to the following standards:

 Animal feed is all vegetarian.
 No antibiotics.
 No growth hormones.
 Animals must be traceable to the farm where they were raised.
 Animals are cage-free and free-roaming.
 Empire passes regular third party animal welfare audits, including those conducted by customers such as Whole Foods and Costco.

In addition, Empire offers a line of Organic products. The company recently launched a "Green Kosher" marketing campaign.

Kashrut and processing
A team of 65 rabbis oversee the kosher slaughter process in Mifflintown. The rabbis live in on-site dormitories during the week, and the plant has its own mikvah and shul. Empire poultry is raised, slaughtered and processed in accordance with the rules of kashrut, and is certified by the Orthodox Union and Rabbi Yechiel Babad, Tartikov Rav.
Until recently, KAJ from Washington Heights NY, have been one of the main Kosher supervisors on most Empire Products. KAJ pulled its Rabbinic supervision after it was not guaranteed tha with the inclusion of another Rabbinic supervision its strict Kosher protocols will be met .
As part of the kosher production process, salt is used to cleanse blood from the animal. A result of this is that kosher poultry is preferred by some non-kosher consumers for the alleged "juiciness" provided by this brining. Cook's Illustrated regularly recommends Empire Kosher chickens and turkeys in part due to this distinctive taste.

Distribution
Empire products are available in national and regional supermarket chains including Trader Joe's, Shaw's, Star Market, Safeway, and Giant. Empire is also available at many Costco stores, and through a number of online grocers. It sells its Kosher Valley line exclusively for Whole Foods.

In 2010, Empire acquired the Kosher Valley brand from natural and organic foods producer Hain Celestial Group.

In March 2015, The Hain Celestial Group, Inc. (NASDAQ: HAIN) Hain Celestial Group, announced the acquisition of the remaining approximately 80% that it did not already own of EK Holdings, Inc. and its wholly owned subsidiary, Empire Kosher Poultry, Inc. for a purchase price of $57.6 million, which included net debt that was repaid at closing.

See also 

Impact of the 2019–20 coronavirus pandemic on the meat industry in the United States

References

Further reading

External links
Empire Kosher Official website

Agriculture companies of the United States
Companies based in Juniata County, Pennsylvania
Food manufacturers of the United States
Meat processing in the United States
Brand name meats
Brand name poultry meats
American companies established in 1938
1938 establishments in New York (state)
Kosher meat